Jo Vermast (born 29 September 1981 in Ostend) is a Belgium football midfielder who currently plays for KV Kortrijk. He joined MVV in 2007, he came from K.V. Kortrijk.

References
Guardian Football

1981 births
Living people
Belgian footballers
Belgian Pro League players
K.V. Kortrijk players
MVV Maastricht players
Sportspeople from Ostend
Footballers from West Flanders
K.M.S.K. Deinze players
Association football midfielders